Cyril "Charles" Leonard Elwell Cudworth (30 October 1908 – 26 December 1977) was a British musicologist, librarian, and librettist.

Life 
Born in Cambridge as the second son of David Cudworth, Cudworth was known as “Charles”. Encouraged in his musical studies by Edward J. Dent, he became Assistant Librarian of the Music Section at Cambridge University Library from 1943 to 1946. Three years later, he was appointed Librarian of the Pendlebury Library of Music later becoming Curator in 1957 and holding this post until he retired. In 1958, he was awarded an Honorary MA degree by the University Cambridge. He was also a founder Member of the International Association of Music Libraries.

Cudworth's musicological interests focussed on eighteenth century English music and he was an authority on the English symphony, keyboard concerto and Handel. He established that ‘Purcell's Trumpet Voluntary’ was by Jeremiah Clarke. He was also a contributor to the Encyclopaedia Britannica and the New Grove Dictionary of Music and Musicians. In addition, he was also interested in local history, architecture, poetry and was librettist for several works by his friend Patrick Hadley.

Select bibliography

References 

1908 births
1977 deaths
British librarians
British librettists
People from Cambridge
Music librarians
20th-century British musicologists
Handel scholars